Breaking Point is a 1976 Canadian-American crime drama film starring Bo Svenson and Robert Culp, produced and directed by Bob Clark.

Plot
Vincent Karbone (John Colicos) is a leading construction magnate in Philadelphia and a suspected leader of one of the city's most notorious Mafia gangs. Several of his thugs are on trial and the key witness is Michael, a mild-mannered judo instructor with a wife and kids. Karbone will stop at nothing to keep the muscles of his organization out of prison, including striking at Michael's family to keep him from testifying.

The instructor Michael McBain (Bo Svenson) witnesses a murder, but he offers to testify against the thugs working for construction manager Vincent Karbone. Despite being placed in the witness protection program, Michael and his large extended family are soon targeted by Vincent's men. Though some of Vincent's goons are sent to prison, the attacks against Michael continue. With the police unable to help, he is forced to turn to violent measures to protect himself.

The Mafia is bent on revenge against this man who testified against them. There is no getaway so he is forced to take extreme measures.

Cast
 Bo Svenson as Michael McBain
 Robert Culp as Frank Sirrianni
 John Colicos as Vincent Karbone
 Belinda Montgomery as Diana McBain
 Linda Sorenson as Helen McBain
 Stephen Young as Peter Stratas
 Doug Lennox as Damoni

References

External links
 
 

1976 films
1970s action films
20th Century Fox films
Films directed by Bob Clark
Category:Films about the American Mafia
1976 crime drama films
American crime drama films
English-language Canadian films
Canadian crime drama films
Films set in Philadelphia
Films with screenplays by Stanley Mann
1970s English-language films
1970s American films
1970s Canadian films